Karl J. Priebe (July 1, 1914 – July 5, 1976) was an American painter from Milwaukee, Wisconsin whose studies and paintings of birds, exotic animals, and African-American culture won him international recognition.

Biography 

Priebe was born in Milwaukee, Wisconsin, to Emil and Katherine Priebe. He graduated from the Layton School of Art, which closed due to financial insolvency in 1974. He also studied at the School of the Art Institute of Chicago, graduating in 1938. After serving on the anthropology staff of the Milwaukee Public Museum (1938–1942) and as director of the Kalamazoo Institute of the Arts (1943–1944), he returned to Layton as an instructor in 1947.

He was one of the few Wisconsin artists of his generation to escape the regionalist label and win showings in prestigious galleries, like those in New York City. His paintings were shown at major public and private galleries, among them the Milwaukee Art Museum, the Corcoran Gallery, Museum of Modern Art, and the Art Institute of Chicago.

He drew the inspiration for his works from numerous locations. His paintings of exotic animals can be attributed to his numerous trips to the Milwaukee County Zoo while attending the Layton School of Art. He first became interested in African-American culture when, as an art student in Chicago, he taught a class in a settlement house largely attended by African Americans. His black figures, he recalled later, were not intended as portraits, but were taken from his memories of people he saw in the settlement house.

He was the only Milwaukeean ever to receive the Prix de Rome, an honor accorded to him in 1941. Because of wartime condition he was unable to use the grant to study in Europe.  Throughout his creative life Priebe was known for his love of black culture. He was a longtime friend of such jazz greats as Billie Holiday, Pearl Bailey and Dizzy Gillespie and of painters Gertrude Abercrombie and John Wilde.

Later life 

In his later years Priebe suffered from a number of ailments. In November 1975 he had one of his eyes surgically removed. After that his health began to decline. He died at his home in Milwaukee after a long struggle with cancer on July 5, 1976, at the age of 62.

See also 
Marquette University Special Collections and University Archives

References

External links 
Archival collections
Karl J. Priebe Papers in the Marquette University Archives

1914 births
1976 deaths
Artists from Milwaukee
Painters from Wisconsin
20th-century American painters
American male painters
20th-century American male artists